This is a list of accidents where all or part of a major sports team had been killed or seriously injured.

Sports teams fatalities from aviation accidents and incidents
(Click on date for associated article)

1.  Frölunda chartered three planes to carry the entire team's roster, one of which carried seven team members and crashed.

Accidents involving other modes of transport
(Click on date for associated article where present)

See also

2018 Leicester helicopter crash
2019 Piper PA-46 Malibu crash
2020 Calabasas helicopter crash
Flamengo training ground fire

References

Sports teams

^
Sports-related accidents and incidents